The Four Marriages of Matthias Merenus is a 1924 German silent comedy film directed by Werner Funck and starring Grete Reinwald, Rudolf Biebrach and Margarete Kupfer.

Cast
 Grete Reinwald
 Rudolf Biebrach
 Margarete Kupfer
 Leonhard Haskel
 Ernst Hofmann
 Hans Unterkircher

References

Bibliography
 Gerhard Lamprecht. Deutsche Stummfilme, Volume 8.

External links

1924 films
Films of the Weimar Republic
German silent feature films
Films directed by Werner Funck
German black-and-white films
1924 comedy films
German comedy films
Films based on Austrian novels
Films based on works by Karl Hans Strobl
Silent comedy films
1920s German films
1920s German-language films